FC Nitra is a Slovak association football club, playing in the town of Nitra. Established in 1909, FC Nitra is one of the oldest football clubs in Slovakia.

History

Czechoslovak era
Nitra were promoted and relegated 4 times from the Czechoslovak First League with their longest stay being 5 years (1979–1984, 1986–1991). Nitra came close to clinching the title in 1962 only to lose out by 3 points to Dukla Prague. This year was most successful in club history because they reached also Mitropa Cup final. Another successful period was end of 80s when Nitra stayed on top positions in Czechoslovak First League (in 1989 they reached 3rd place) with players like Michal Hipp, Ľubomír Moravčík, Ladislav Molnár, Peter Palúch, Jozef Majoroš, Róbert Tomaschek, Miroslav Sovič. FC Nitra was the first football professional club in the former Czechoslovakia.

Slovak era
Nitra was involved in the inaugural Slovakian championship in 1994 but was relegated to the second division after their first season. The following season they were promoted back to the first division, only for the same fate to occur and were again relegated. Roller coaster seasons became somewhat of an FC Nitra speciality during the early 90s, until the promotions stopped in 2001 where fans had to wait five long seasons before seeing their club again return to the top flight where they finished with a respectable fifth place. This was mainly due to the work of head coach Ivan Galád, who took control of the team in the winter of 2004, guiding the team to a fourth-place finish in the second division.

Róbert Rák became the top goal scorer both in the second division in the 2004/2005 season and (together with Erik Jendrišek) in the first division in the 2005/2006 season. In the beginning of the next season he was transferred to MFK Ružomberok. Galád  coached the team very defensively (as according to his words no good striker was in the team). Galád lost his job after not much good results of the team at the end of 2006/2007 season (many losses and draws). The former Czech player Pavel Hapal was named as the head coach of the team for the 2007/2008 season. His way of coaching brought almost immediately very good results and the team finished 3rd (the best in the history of the club). After the season Hapal decided to leave the club to accept an offer from the top Czech club FK Mladá Boleslav. Pavel Malura, another coach from the Czech Republic, has taken the job. In spring   2009 the new manager Petar Kurčubić was appointed.

In 2021 after the club was relegated from the top flight, they did not obtain a licence for the league below and so were further demoted another level.

Events timeline 
 1909 – Founded as Nyitrai ÖTTSO
 1911 – Renamed Nyitrai TVE
 1919 – Renamed Nyitrai SC
 1921 – Renamed SK Nitra
 1923 – Renamed AC Nitra
 1948 – Renamed Sokol Nitra
 1949 – Renamed ZSJ Sokol spojene zavody Nitra
 1949 – Renamed ZK KP Nitra
 1953 – Renamed DSO Slavoj Nitra
 1956 – Renamed TJ Slovan Nitra
 1966 – Again Renamed AC Nitra
 1976 – Renamed TJ Plastika Nitra
 1989 – First European qualification, 1990
 1990 – Renamed FC Nitra

Honours

Domestic 
 Czechoslovakia
 Czechoslovak First League (1925–1993)
  Runners-Up (1): 1961–62
  Third place (1): 1988-89
 1.SNL (1st Slovak National football league) (1969–1993)
  Winners (3): 1978–79, 1985–86, 1991–92
 Slovakia
 Slovak League (1993–Present)
  Third place (1): 2007–08
 Slovenský Pohár (Slovak Cup) (1961–Present) 1
  Runners-up (4): 1974–75, 1982–83, 1986–87, 1990–91
 Slovak Second Division (1993–Present)
  Winners (3): 1994–95, 1997–98, 2004–05
  Runners-Up (2): 2000–01, 2016-17

Czechoslovak and Slovak Top Goalscorer 
The Czechoslovak League top scorer from 1944–45 until 1992–93. Since the 1993–94 Slovak League Top scorer.

1Shared award

European 
 Mitropa Cup 2
  Runners-up: 1961
 Intertoto Cup
  Winners (3): 1972, 1973, 1980

Sponsorship

Current squad 
Updated 5 August 2021

Out on loan

Current technical staff 
Updated 2 March 2023

Results

League and Cup history
Slovak League only (1993–present)
{|class="wikitable"
! style="color:#1B1B1B; background:#69D2E7;"| Season
! style="color:#1B1B1B; background:#69D2E7;"| Division (Name)
! style="color:#1B1B1B; background:#69D2E7;"| Pos./Teams
! style="color:#1B1B1B; background:#69D2E7;"| Pl.
! style="color:#1B1B1B; background:#69D2E7;"| W
! style="color:#1B1B1B; background:#69D2E7;"| D
! style="color:#1B1B1B; background:#69D2E7;"| L
! style="color:#1B1B1B; background:#69D2E7;"| GS
! style="color:#1B1B1B; background:#69D2E7;"| GA
! style="color:#1B1B1B; background:#69D2E7;"| P
! style="color:#1B1B1B; background:#69D2E7;"|Slovak Cup
! style="color:#1B1B1B; background:#69D2E7;" colspan=2|Europe
! style="color:#1B1B1B; background:#69D2E7;"|Top Scorer (Goals)
|-
|align=center|1993–94
|align=center|1st (Mars Superliga)
|align=center bgcolor=red|12/(12)
|align=center|32
|align=center|12
|align=center|3
|align=center|17
|align=center|39
|align=center|46
|align=center|27
|align=center|Round 3
|align=center|
|align=center|
|align=center|
|-
|align=center|1994–95
|align=center|2nd (1. liga)
|align=center bgcolor=green|1/(16)
|align=center|30
|align=center|19
|align=center|5
|align=center|6
|align=center|58
|align=center|29
|align=center|62
|align=center|Round 2
|align=center|
|align=center|
|align=center| Prochászka (13)
|-
|-
|align=center|1995–96
|align=center|1st (Mars Superliga)
|align=center|11/(12) 
|align=center|32
|align=center|7
|align=center|5
|align=center|20
|align=center|30
|align=center|59
|align=center|26
|align=center|Round 1
|align=center|
|align=center|
|align=center| Norbert Hrnčár (7)
|-
|align=center|1996–97
|align=center|1st (Mars Superliga)
|align=center bgcolor=red|16/(16)
|align=center|30
|align=center|5
|align=center|5
|align=center|20
|align=center|22
|align=center|48
|align=center|20
|align=center|Round 1
|align=center|
|align=center|
|align=center|
|-
|align=center|1997–98
|align=center|2nd (1. liga)
|align=center bgcolor=green|1/(16)
|align=center|34
|align=center|20
|align=center|8
|align=center|6
|align=center|73
|align=center|36
|align=center|68
|align=center|Round 2
|align=center|
|align=center| 
|align=center|  Peter Hodúr (18)
|-
|align=center|1998–99
|align=center|1st (Mars Superliga)
|align=center|12/(16)
|align=center|30
|align=center|7
|align=center|7
|align=center|16
|align=center|28
|align=center|48
|align=center|28
|align=center|Round 2
|align=center|
|align=center|
|align=center|  Marián Klago (8)  
|-
|align=center|1999–00
|align=center|1st (Mars Superliga)
|align=center bgcolor=red|13/(16)
|align=center|30
|align=center|8
|align=center|4
|align=center|18
|align=center|24
|align=center|44
|align=center|28
|align=center|Round 2
|align=center| 
|align=center| 
|align=center|  Róbert Jež (4)   Jozef Jelšic (4) 
|-
|align=center|2000–01
|align=center|2nd (1. Liga)
|align=center|2/(18)
|align=center|34
|align=center|21
|align=center|3
|align=center|10
|align=center|77
|align=center|27
|align=center|66
|align=center|Round 1
|align=center|
|align=center|
|align=center|   Mário Breška (23)
|-
|align=center|2001–02
|align=center|2nd (1. Liga)
|align=center|7/(16)
|align=center|30
|align=center|12
|align=center|7
|align=center|11
|align=center|41
|align=center|34
|align=center|43
|align=center|Round 1
|align=center|
|align=center|
|align=center|  Jozef Jelšic (17) 
|-
|align=center|2002–03
|align=center|2nd (1. Liga)
|align=center|12/(16)
|align=center|30
|align=center|11
|align=center|5
|align=center|14
|align=center|36
|align=center|29
|align=center|38
|align=center|Quarter-finals
|align=center|
|align=center|
|align=center| Jozef Jelšic (15) 
|-
|align=center|2003–04
|align=center|2nd (1. Liga)
|align=center|4/(16)
|align=center|30
|align=center|15
|align=center|3
|align=center|12
|align=center|45
|align=center|32
|align=center|48
|align=center|Round 2
|align=center|
|align=center|
|align=center|  Róbert Rák (13)
|-
|align=center|2004–05
|align=center|2nd (1. Liga)
|align=center bgcolor=green|1/(16)
|align=center|36
|align=center|21
|align=center|6
|align=center|3
|align=center|49
|align=center|16
|align=center|69
|align=center|Round 2
|align=center|
|align=center| 
|align=center|  Róbert Rák (27)
|-
|align=center|2005–06
|align=center|1st (Corgoň Liga)
|align=center|5/(10)
|align=center|36
|align=center|12
|align=center|9
|align=center|15
|align=center|42
|align=center|48
|align=center|45
|align=center|Semi-finals
|align=center| UI
|align=center| 2.R ( Dnipro)
|align=center| Róbert Rák (21)
|-
|align=center|2006–07
|align=center|1st (Corgoň Liga)
|align=center|6/(12)
|align=center|28
|align=center|9
|align=center|4
|align=center|15
|align=center|21
|align=center|33
|align=center|31
|align=center|Quarter-finals
|align=center| 
|align=center| 
|align=center|  Andrej Hesek (6)
|-
|align=center|2007–08
|align=center|1st (Corgoň Liga)
|align=center bgcolor=tan|3/(12)
|align=center|33
|align=center|17
|align=center|6
|align=center|10
|align=center|40
|align=center|26
|align=center|57
|align=center|Quarter-finals
|align=center| UI
|align=center| 1.R ( Neftçi Baku)
|align=center|  Andrej Hesek (5)   Jan Gruber (5) 
|-
|align=center|2008–09
|align=center|1st (Corgoň Liga)
|align=center|11/(12)
|align=center|33
|align=center|9
|align=center|8
|align=center|16
|align=center|34
|align=center|53
|align=center|35
|align=center|Round 2
|align=center|
|align=center| 
|align=center|  Róbert Rák (9)
|-
|align=center|2009–10
|align=center|1st (Corgoň Liga)
|align=center|4/(12)
|align=center|33
|align=center|14
|align=center|6
|align=center|13
|align=center|42
|align=center|40
|align=center|48
|align=center|Round 3
|align=center|
|align=center|
|align=center|  Róbert Rák (18)
|-
|align=center|2010–11
|align=center|1st (Corgoň Liga)
|align=center|8/(12)
|align=center|33
|align=center|11
|align=center|7
|align=center|15
|align=center|30
|align=center|51
|align=center|40
|align=center|Quarter-finals
|align=center| EL
|align=center| Q1 ( ETO Győr)
|align=center|  Róbert Rák (9)
|-
|align=center|2011–12
|align=center|1st (Corgoň Liga)
|align=center|8/(12)
|align=center|33
|align=center|9
|align=center|12
|align=center|12
|align=center|33
|align=center|39
|align=center|39
|align=center|Round 3
|align=center| 
|align=center|
|align=center|  Vratislav Gajdoš (5)
|-
|align=center|2012–13
|align=center|1st (Corgoň Liga)
|align=center|10/(12)
|align=center|33
|align=center|11
|align=center|6
|align=center|16
|align=center|39
|align=center|54
|align=center|36
|align=center|Round 3
|align=center|
|align=center|
|align=center|  Cléber (11) 
|-
|align=center|2013–14
|align=center|1st (Corgoň Liga)
|align=center bgcolor=red|12/(12)
|align=center|33
|align=center|6
|align=center|8
|align=center|19
|align=center|33
|align=center|63
|align=center|26
|align=center|Round 2
|align=center|
|align=center|
|align=center|  Cléber (7)
|-
|align=center|2014–15
|align=center|2nd (DOXXbet Liga)
|align=center|5/(24)
|align=center|22
|align=center|8
|align=center|7
|align=center|7
|align=center|26
|align=center|25
|align=center|31
|align=center|Round 5
|align=center|
|align=center|
|align=center|  Matúš Paukner (21)
|-
|align=center|2015–16
|align=center|2nd (DOXXbet Liga)
|align=center|7/(24)
|align=center|30
|align=center|13
|align=center|7
|align=center|10
|align=center|54
|align=center|36
|align=center|46
|align=center|Round 4
|align=center|
|align=center|
|align=center|  Matúš Paukner (17)
|-
|align=center|2016–17
|align=center|2nd (DOXXbet liga)
|align=center bgcolor=green|2/(24)
|align=center|30
|align=center|18
|align=center|5
|align=center|7
|align=center|57
|align=center|32
|align=center|59 
|align=center|Round 5
|align=center|
|align=center|
|align=center|  Filip Balaj (20)
|-
|align=center|2017-18
|align=center|1st (Fortuna Liga)
|align=center |7/(12)
|align=center|31
|align=center|10
|align=center|12
|align=center|9
|align=center|28
|align=center|27
|align=center|42
|align=center |Round 5
|align=center| 
|align=center| 
|align=center|  Filip Balaj (6)   Tomáš Vestenický (6)
|-
|align=center|2018-19
|align=center|1st (Fortuna Liga)
|align=center |9/(12)
|align=center|32
|align=center|8
|align=center|10
|align=center|14
|align=center|42
|align=center|48
|align=center|34
|align=center |Quarter-finals
|align=center| 
|align=center| 
|align=center|  Tomáš Vestenický (10)
|-
|align=center|2019-20
|align=center|1st (Fortuna Liga)
|align=center |12/(12)
|align=center|27
|align=center|7
|align=center|4
|align=center|16
|align=center|23
|align=center|36
|align=center|25
|align=center |Quarter-finals
|align=center| 
|align=center| 
|align=center|  Milan Ristovski (12)
|-
|align=center|2020-21
|align=center|1st (Fortuna Liga)
|align=center bgcolor=red|12/(12)1
|align=center|32
|align=center|7
|align=center|6
|align=center|19
|align=center|26
|align=center|55
|align=center|27
|align=center|Round 3
|align=center| 
|align=center| 
|align=center|  Michal Faško (8)
|-
|align=center|2021–22
|align=center|3rd (III. liga)
|align=center bgcolor=red|16/(18)
|align=center|34
|align=center|8
|align=center|2
|align=center|24
|align=center|42
|align=center|75
|align=center|26
|align=center|Round 2
|align=center| 
|align=center| 
|align=center|  Adrián Mokoš (10)
|}
1 FC Nitra did not obtain a licence for the 2021–22 season

European competition history

UEFA-administered

Not UEFA-administered

Player records

Most goals

Notable players 
Had international caps for their respective countries. Players whose name is listed in bold represented their countries while playing for FC Nitra.

Past (and present) players who are the subjects of Wikipedia articles can be found here.

Former managers

 Zoltán Opata (1935–36)
 Karol Bučko (1959–63)
 Ladislav Putera (1963–64)
 E. Farman (1964–65)
 František Skyva (1965–68)
 Jozef Čurgaly (1968–70)
 Michal Pucher (1970–74)
 Ján Dinga (1974–75)
 Theodor Reimann (1975–76)
 Michal Pucher (1976–77)
 František Skyva (1978–83)
 František Urvay (1983)
 Jiří Lopata (1984)
 Stanislav Jarábek (1984–85)
 Jozef Jarabinský (1985–86)
 Kamil Majerník (1986–88)
 Milan Lešický (1988–91)
 Karol Pecze (1991–92)
 Stanislav Jarábek (1992–93)
 S. Dominka (1993)
 Ivan Horn (1993–95)
 Milan Albrecht (2001)
 Ivan Galád (2004–07)
 Pavel Hapal (1 Jul 2007 – 30 Jun 2008)
 Pavel Malura (9 Jun 2008 – 28 Sep 2008)
 Marián Süttö (28 Sep 2008 – 31 Dec 2008)
 Petar Kurčubić (1 Jan 2009 – 30 Jun 2009)
 Ivan Galád (1 Jul 2010 – 13 Jan 2011)
 Ivan Vrabec (15 Jan 2011 – 14 Mar 2011)
 Cyril Stachura (15 Mar 2011 – 19 Nov 2011)
 Róbert Barborík (interim) (20 Nov 2011 – 19 Dec 2011)
 Ladislav Jurkemik (20 Dec 2011 – 5 Nov 2012)
 Jozef Vukušič (6 Nov 2012 – 30 Jun 2013)
 Ladislav Šimčo (1 Jul 2013 – 27 Aug 2013)
 Vladimír Koník (27 Aug 2013 – 19 Feb 2014)
 Ladislav Hudec (19 Feb 2014 – June 2014)
 Michal Hipp (Jun 2014 – 23 Sep 2015)
 Róbert Barborík (23 Sep 2015 – 5 Jan 2017)
 Ivan Galád (5 Jan 2017 – 13 Mar 2019)
 Michal Kuruc (13 Mar 2019 – 20 Jun 2019)
 Marián Süttö (20 Jun 2019 – 6 Jan 2020)
 Anatoliy Demyanenko (6 Jan 2020 – May 2020)
 Miroslav Nemec (May 2020 – 29 Jun 2020) 
 Ivan Galád (29 Jun 2020 – Aug 2020)
 Gergely Geri (Aug 2020 – 1 Dec 2020)
 Ivan Galád (interim) (1 Dec 2020 – 4 Jan 2021)
 Michal Ščasný  (4 Jan 2021 – 22 Jan 2021)
 Peter Lérant  (22 Jan 2021 – 25 Mar 2021)
 Michal Ščasný  (26 Mar 2021 – 24 Jan 2022)
 Miloš Foltán  (25 Jan 2022-12 apr 2022)
 Augustín Antalík (13 apr 2022 - July 2022)
 Jozef Kozák  (July 2022 - 28 Feb 2023)
 Dušan Borko (1 mar 2023-)

References

External links 
  
 FC Nitra Ultras 

 
Nitra
Sport in Nitra
Nitra
Nitra FC
1909 establishments in Slovakia